Massachusetts House of Representatives' 13th Worcester district in the United States is one of 160 legislative districts included in the lower house of the Massachusetts General Court. It covers part of the city of Worcester in Worcester County. Democrat John Mahoney of Worcester has represented the district since 2011.

The current district geographic boundary overlaps with that of the Massachusetts Senate's 1st Worcester district.

Representatives
 Joseph A. Denny, circa 1858 
 John L. Bush, circa 1859 
 Frank E. Holman, circa 1888 
 Harrison Emmons Morton, circa 1888 
 Edwin Gates Norman, circa 1920 
 Joseph D. Ward, circa 1951 
 Angelo Picucci, circa 1975 
 Thomas P. White
 Kevin O'Sullivan
 Harriette L. Chandler
 Robert Spellane
 John J. Mahoney, Jr., 2011-current

Former locales
The district previously covered:
 Southborough, circa 1872 
 Westborough, circa 1872

See also
 List of Massachusetts House of Representatives elections
 Other Worcester County districts of the Massachusetts House of Representatives: 1st, 2nd, 3rd, 4th, 5th, 6th, 7th, 8th, 9th, 10th, 11th, 12th, 14th, 15th, 16th, 17th, 18th
 Worcester County districts of the Massachusett Senate: 1st, 2nd; Hampshire, Franklin and Worcester; Middlesex and Worcester; Worcester, Hampden, Hampshire and Middlesex; Worcester and Middlesex; Worcester and Norfolk
 List of Massachusetts General Courts
 List of former districts of the Massachusetts House of Representatives

Images
Portraits of legislators

References

External links
 Ballotpedia
  (State House district information based on U.S. Census Bureau's American Community Survey).
 League of Women Voters of the Worcester Area

House
Government in Worcester County, Massachusetts